Peach Fuzz may refer to:

 Vellus hair or peach fuzz, fine hair on human children
 Peach Fuzz (comics), an English-language manga 2005–7
 Peach Fuzz (album), by Enuff Z'Nuff, 1996
 "Peachfuzz / Gasface Refill", a 1990 song by KMD
 "Peach Fuzz", a 1964 instrumental by The Ventures
 "Peach Fuzz", a 2018 song by Tyler, the Creator

See also
 Peach
 Peter Peachfuzz, a cartoon character in Rocky and Bullwinkle